James Martin (born 23 June 1998) is an English professional footballer who plays as a left-back for Whitby Town.

Playing career
Martin had a one-year scholarship with Scottish Championship club Queen of the South, but had to leave the club following issues over international clearance. He signed his first professional contract with Hartlepool United in May 2016, following a successful trial spell. He made his senior debut as a 74th-minute substitute for Jake Carroll in a 2–1 defeat to Notts County in an EFL Trophy group match at Meadow Lane on 4 October 2016.

After leaving Hartlepool, Martin signed for Dunston UTS. The following season, Martin moved to Whitley Bay.

In May 2020, Whitby Town signed Martin from Whitley Bay.

Statistics

References

1998 births
Living people
People from Washington, Tyne and Wear
Footballers from Tyne and Wear
English footballers
Association football fullbacks
Queen of the South F.C. players
Hartlepool United F.C. players
Whitby Town F.C. players
English Football League players